Arne Hardy "Lill-Arne" Carlsson (13 July 1924 – 10 February 2011) was a Swedish gymnast. He competed at the 1952 Summer Olympics in all artistic gymnastics events with the best individual result of 44th place on the vault.

References

1924 births
2011 deaths
Gymnasts at the 1952 Summer Olympics
Olympic gymnasts of Sweden
Swedish male artistic gymnasts
Sportspeople from Örebro